KMOV (channel 4) is a television station in St. Louis, Missouri, United States, affiliated with CBS and MyNetworkTV. It is owned by Gray Television alongside low-power Circle owned-and-operated station KDTL-LD (channel 16). The two stations share studios at the Gateway Tower on Memorial Drive in Downtown St. Louis, near the Gateway Arch; KMOV's transmitter is located in Lemay, Missouri.

History

Early history
The station first signed on the air on July 8, 1954, as KWK-TV. At its launch, channel 4 was owned by a consortium which included Robert T. Convey (28%) and the now-defunct Newhouse Newspapers-published St. Louis Globe-Democrat (23%), who jointly operated KWK radio (1380 AM, now KXFN); Elzey M. Roberts Sr., former owner of KXOK radio (630 AM, frequency now occupied by KYFI), which had to be sold as a condition of the license grant (23%); and Missouri Valley Television Inc., made up of Saint Paul, Minnesota–based Hubbard Broadcasting (23%) and several St. Louis residents (combined 3%).

Each of the station's part-owners had competed individually for the channel 4 construction permit before agreeing to merge their interests only three months before the station went on the air. Upon signing on KWK-TV took the CBS affiliation from Belleville, Illinois–licensed WTVI (channel 54, now KTVI channel 2). Until 1955, it also aired ABC programs that WTVI declined to broadcast. The station's original studios, built by KWK radio in anticipation of television, were located on Cole Street in Downtown West.

As a CBS owned-and-operated station
However, CBS was planning to operate its own television station in St. Louis alongside its powerhouse radio station, KMOX (1120 AM). The network originally won the permit to build a new station on channel 11 – the last remaining commercial VHF channel assigned to St. Louis – in January 1957. But after being approached with an offer, CBS decided in August of that year to buy KWK-TV instead for $4 million. The agreement required CBS to give up its construction permit for channel 11, and the Federal Communications Commission transferred it to one of the failed applicants, a group led by St. Louis hotelier Harold Koplar, for no financial consideration. Almost immediately, the deal was held up after the St. Louis Amusement Company, another of the original applicants for channel 11, protested to the United States Court of Appeals in January 1958. The U.S. Supreme Court ultimately upheld the decision in November of that year. CBS had already taken control of channel 4's operations that March, and changed its call letters to KMOX-TV in reference to its new radio sister. The following April, channel 11 signed on as independent station KPLR-TV.

In July 1968, CBS opened a new studio and office facility in downtown St. Louis to house the KMOX stations, which until that point had been operating from separate locations (KMOX radio was headquartered near Forest Park). Channel 4 moved from Cole Street into the new facility, known as One Memorial Drive, and remains there to the present day; the Cole Street studio was soon acquired by KDNL-TV (channel 30), which has operated from there since it signed on in June 1969.

KMOX-TV was the host station for the 1983 Miss Universe Pageant, which was held at the now-demolished Kiel Auditorium.

Viacom ownership
By late 1985, CBS was in rough financial straits, an after-effect of successfully fending off a hostile takeover attempt by Ted Turner the year before. CBS spent the latter portion of 1985 repurchasing a large portion of its stock to help block the Turner takeover. Once Turner sold his stock, CBS was saddled with significant debt and needed to raise money. Not long after Laurence Tisch became the company's chairman, CBS decided to sell KMOX-TV, at the time its smallest owned-and-operated television station by market size. On May 16, 1986, the original iteration of Viacom, the former CBS Inc. subsidiary and future parent company, completed its $122.5 million purchase of the station; so as to comply with an FCC regulation in place at the time that prohibited TV and radio stations in the same market but with different ownership from having the same callsigns, KMOX-TV's callsign was slightly modified to the present KMOV almost a month later on June 18. Despite the sale, channel 4's operations continued to be based alongside KMOX radio at their downtown studios on Memorial Drive; KMOX would relocate from that building in 2012.

Viacom announced its purchase of Paramount Pictures in 1993. The merger, completed in 1994, placed Viacom's existing five-station group (KMOV; WHEC-TV in Rochester, New York; WNYT in Albany, New York; WVIT in New Britain, Connecticut; and KSLA-TV in Shreveport, Louisiana) under common ownership with the Paramount Stations Group; the two groups were formally consolidated in December 1995. However, in 1994, the company decided to divest itself of all of its major network affiliates to focus on stations that carried its then-upstart United Paramount Network (UPN), which would start up service on January 16, 1995.

Belo Corporation ownership
Dallas-based A. H. Belo Corporation acquired KMOV in a three-way deal also involving two stations in the Seattle–Tacoma market. As part of the transaction, A. H. Belo (which spun off its broadcast holdings into a separate, similarly named company in 2008) sold KIRO-TV (then a UPN affiliate, which was included in the deal because the company had recently acquired that market's NBC affiliate KING-TV) to Cox Enterprises, who concurrently sold its existing Seattle–Tacoma station, then-CBS affiliate KSTW, to Viacom. The deal was consummated on June 1, 1997 (KIRO and KSTW swapped their affiliations on June 30, 1997, thus returning to its original affiliation).

The station aired St. Louis Blues NHL games for one season, during the 1996–97 season until their over-the-air telecasts moved back to KPLR-TV for the 1997–98 season (all regular-season Blues games are now broadcast exclusively on cable locally on Bally Sports Midwest).

In the spring of 2013, a permanent lighted sign with the KMOV logo was installed on the top of the south face of Gateway Tower, which not only gives the station visibility on the St. Louis skyline, but is also visible in center field of wide shots of Busch Stadium during St. Louis Cardinals games.

Changing hands
On June 13, 2013, the Gannett Company, owner of NBC affiliate KSDK (channel 5), announced that it would acquire Belo. As the deal would violate FCC regulations that disallow common ownership of two of the four highest-rated stations in a single market (KMOV and KSDK have ranked as the top two stations in the St. Louis market in total-day ratings for several years), Gannett would retain KSDK, while it would spin off KMOV to Sander Media, LLC (owned by former Belo executive Jack Sander). Gannett intended to provide services to the station through a shared services agreement, KMOV's operations were to remain largely separate from KSDK, including separate and competing news and sales departments. However, on December 16, 2013, the United States Department of Justice threatened to block the merger unless Gannett, Belo and Sander completely divested KMOV to a government-approved third-party company that would be barred from entering into any agreements with Gannett. The DOJ claimed that Gannett and Sander would be so closely aligned that Gannett would have dominated spot advertising in St. Louis. On December 23, 2013, shortly after the Gannett/Belo deal was approved and completed, Des Moines, Iowa-based Meredith Corporation – which already had a broadcasting presence in Missouri through its ownership of fellow CBS affiliate KCTV in Kansas City – announced that it would purchase KMOV, along with KTVK and KASW in Phoenix (the latter of which Meredith would later sell to the Nexstar Broadcasting Group) for $407.5 million. The sale of KMOV was completed on February 28, 2014.

More than a year later on September 8, 2015, Richmond, Virginia-based Media General announced that it would acquire Meredith for $2.4 billion. If it had been completed, it would have marked KMOV's third ownership shift since 2013. Media General would eventually shelve the Meredith deal in favor of a counter-offer by Nexstar.

On April 24, 2018, it was announced that Meredith would be acquiring CW affiliate KPLR-TV from Tribune Media as a result of station sales ordered by the FCC as a result of Tribune's proposed acquisition by Sinclair Broadcast Group, owners of ABC affiliate KDNL-TV. If Sinclair's acquisition of Tribune and related station sales were approved, it would have created a duopoly between KMOV and KPLR-TV. However, on August 9, 2018, Tribune announced it would terminate the Sinclair deal, intending to seek other M&A opportunities. This came three weeks after the FCC's July 18 vote to have the deal reviewed by an administrative law judge amid "serious concerns" about Sinclair's forthrightness in its applications to sell certain conflict properties. Tribune also filed a breach of contract lawsuit in the Delaware Chancery Court, alleging that Sinclair engaged in protracted negotiations with the FCC and the U.S. Department of Justice's Antitrust Division over regulatory issues, refused to sell stations in markets where it already had properties, and proposed divestitures to parties with ties to Sinclair executive chair David D. Smith that were rejected or highly subject to rejection to maintain control over stations it was required to sell. The deal was nullified, with Tribune eventually accepting another merger agreement with Nexstar that, due to other station spin-offs, retained the existing KTVI/KPLR duopoly and closed without issue in mid-September 2019.

Sale to Gray Television
On May 3, 2021, Gray Television announced its intent to purchase the Meredith Local Media division, including KMOV, for $2.7 billion. The sale was completed on December 1. As a result, KMOV gained additional sister stations in nearby markets, including fellow CBS affiliate KFVS-TV in Cape Girardeau, NBC/ABC affiliates KYTV and KSPR-LD in Springfield and NBC/Fox affiliates KYOU in Kirksville and WGEM-TV in Quincy. It also resulted in Gray owning stations in every Missouri TV market except for Joplin, St. Joseph and Columbia–Jefferson City.

Programming
KMOV airs much of the CBS network schedule, however, it preempts the CBS Thanksgiving Day Parade and the 4th of July episode of The Price Is Right. Syndicated programs broadcast on KMOV include Dr. Phil, Inside Edition and Entertainment Tonight. Syndicated programs broadcast on KMOV-DT3 include 25 Words or Less, Divorce Court, Family Guy and Bob's Burgers, among others.

Past programming preemptions and deferrals
As a CBS-owned station, channel 4 cleared the entire network schedule (and broadcast 24/7 as a result). When Viacom took over in 1986, this changed rather drastically. KMOV began signing off the air at night, thus preempting the overnight news program CBS News Nightwatch. A barrage of scattered prime time preemptions later followed that was so rampant, the station earned a mention in Ken Auletta's 1991 book, Three Blind Mice. KMOV randomly replaced CBS prime time shows with programming such as Billy Graham Crusades and National Geographic specials, syndicated movie packages, and occasional local and regional sporting events, all of which allowed the station and Viacom full control of the ad time airing during the preemptions. According to Auletta, KMOV preempted 103 hours of CBS prime time programs in 1987, accounting for nearly 10 percent of the network prime time schedule. In the 1990s, the prime time preemptions eased as all networks began to tighten down contractually on heavy preemptions, and currently, the station only occasionally preempts a CBS prime time show, usually only for breaking news reasons. The station also resumed a 24-hour broadcast schedule in the early 1990s.

From 1989 until September 11, 2015, KMOV aired The Young and the Restless on a same-day delay at 3:00 p.m., and later, at 4:00 p.m. (serving as a lead-in for its early-evening newscasts), with The Price Is Right airing on a one-hour delay at 11:00 a.m.; KMOV also delayed The Late Late Show by a half-hour since 1997 under original host Tom Snyder (one of several CBS stations that have done this practice), in order to run syndicated programming after the Late Show with David Letterman (KMOV completely preempted The Late Late Show during the program's first two years on the air). On September 14, 2015, KMOV moved The Price Is Right, The Young and the Restless and The Late Late Show to their recommended network time periods with the first full season under Meredith ownership, with the relocation of the former two shows occurring as a result of the launch of a half-hour 4:00 p.m. newscast.

Sports programming
KMOX/KMOV served as the unofficial home station of the NFL's St. Louis Cardinals from their arrival in St. Louis in 1960 until the 1987 season, when the team relocated to Phoenix, Arizona. It also aired any games of the city's next NFL team, the Rams from 1998 (when CBS acquired the AFC broadcast package) to 2015 (usually home interconference contests), when the Rams returned to Los Angeles. KMOV aired games of the baseball St. Louis Cardinals from 1990 to 1993 as part of CBS' national broadcast contract with Major League Baseball.

Locally produced non-news programming
In 2003, KMOV began producing At the Zoo, a program that gives a behind-the-scenes look inside the St. Louis Zoo and was hosted by meteorologist Kent Ehrhardt (encore presentations of older episodes aired from 2009 to 2011). In September 2008, KMOV premiered Great Day St. Louis, an hour-long daytime talk show, mostly focusing on entertainment and lifestyle topics in the St. Louis area (the show is currently hosted by Matt Chambers, Kent Ehrhardt, and Laura Hettiger). In January 2011, KMOV debuted At the Center, which features an inside look at attractions at the St. Louis Science Center.

News operation

KMOV presently broadcasts 41 hours of locally produced newscasts each week (with 6½ hours each weekday, five hours on Saturdays and 3½ hours on Sundays). In addition, the station produces the half-hour sports wrap-up program Sports Sunday, which airs on Sundays after the 10:00 p.m. newscast. Many members of KMOV's on-air news staff have moved on to work for national news organizations (Richelle Carey and meteorologist Reynolds Wolf, for example, both joined CNN in 2006). While it would seem like a positive aspect, the "revolving door" turnover rate of its anchors and reporters has been one of KMOV's weaknesses over the years (especially under CBS ownership, where it had the same "farm team" talent development role WKYC in Cleveland played for NBC), leading to the unfamiliarity that many of the station's on-air personalities have in the market. Though this may have initially caused some issues for KMOV, ratings for channel 4's newscasts have since increased. Since the departure of Karen Foss from KSDK in December 2006, Larry Conners assumed the title of the longest-serving 10:00 p.m. news anchor in the market until he was fired by the station in 2013 due to IRS comments on Facebook. Connors filed a discrimination lawsuit against KMOV.

In 1976, channel 4 became the second station to adopt Dick Marx's "WBBM Channel 2 News Theme", that eventually became the de facto official newscast music for CBS' owned-and-operated stations. The theme was dropped by the station in 1986 after Viacom took control, though from 2001 to 2008, the station used the Frank Gari-composed "CBS Enforcer Music Collection", which uses a music signature derived from the WBBM package. Ironically from 1989 to 1992, KMOV used Gari's "News Series 2000", which was traditionally associated with ABC stations, as its news theme. In July 2018, the "CBS Enforcer Music Collection" theme returned to the station, replacing their previous theme, the Gari-composed "The Edge."

KMOX-TV was competitive in the ratings for most of the period from the late 1960s to the early 1980s. From the early 1980s until recently, KMOX-TV/KMOV was a solid, if distant, runner-up to KSDK. However, until the mid-1990s, the station had to fend off spirited competition from KTVI. Although KMOV's newscasts were critically favored, they were rarely rewarded with a ratings win over long-dominant KSDK, with the 10 p.m. newscast regularly winning at least a 20% share in viewership, while KSDK averaged about a 30% share. KMOV has seen significant ratings growth since 2004, and beat KSDK at 10 p.m. both during the November 2004 sweeps period – the first time in over a quarter-century that KSDK did not place first in any timeslot – and during the May and November 2006 sweeps periods; it also became the most-watched late evening newscast in the United States during the latter period. Most of the ratings growth at 10 p.m. was attributed to CBS' prime time ratings increases and NBC's large drop in viewership. However, KMOV also saw growth in all of its other newscast timeslots, even where the station does not benefit from a strong CBS lead-in.  Starting in late 2013, KMOV started to dominate the news ratings in most newscasts, winning the noon, 5:00, 6:00 and 10:00 p.m. time slots, while KSDK plummeted to third place at 5:00 and 6:00 p.m. for the first time in that station's history. Despite the firing of longtime anchor Larry Conners by the station in May 2013, KMOV has placed first among the market's 10:00 p.m. newscast in every demographic every month since that time.

In February 2002, KMOV partnered with the St. Louis Post-Dispatch to produce the weekly news discussion program Extra Edition, hosted by now-former weekday morning anchor Marc Cox.

On January 27, 2008, beginning with its 5:30 p.m. newscast, KMOV became the second television station in the St. Louis market to begin broadcasting its local newscasts in high definition (after KSDK, which has produced its newscasts in the format since 2006).

Notable former on-air staff
 Joe Buck – reporter; now at ESPN
 Richelle Carey – reporter (2003–2006); now at Al Jazeera English
 Dan Dierdorf – sports director, former Cardinals football player, also an analyst for CBS Sports, ABC Sports and currently Michigan Wolverines football
 Roger Grimsby – reporter/news correspondent (1959–1961); deceased
 Jim Hart – sports anchor (former quarterback for the NFL's St. Louis Cardinals)
 Linda Lorelle – reporter (late 1980s); later worked at KPRC-TV in Houston
 Russ Mitchell – anchor/reporter (late 1980s); later with CBS News, now at WKYC in Cleveland
 Regis Philbin – hosted one of his early syndicated shows from the KMOX-TV studios (1972–1975); deceased
 Steve Savard – sports anchor (1997–2013) and news anchor (2013–2020); now lead anchor at KOLR in Springfield, Missouri
 Barry Serafin – anchor/reporter (1967–1971) became Washington, D.C. correspondent for CBS News in 1971; later with ABC News
 Reynolds Wolf – meteorologist  (2005–2006); later at CNN and at WSB-TV in Atlanta; now with The Weather Channel

Technical information

Subchannels
The station's digital signal is multiplexed:

On February 17, 2014, KMOV dropped the Live Well Network, as Meredith planned on using the bandwidth utilized from digital channel 4.3 for the station's ATSC M/H mobile DTV signal. On November 17, 2014, KMOV relaunched 4.3 as "MyTV St. Louis", returning MyNetworkTV (and some syndicated programming) to the market after a nine-month absence due to former affiliate WRBU (channel 46)'s sale to Ion Media Networks and that station's wholesale conversion into an Ion Television owned-and-operated station.

KMOV carried MeTV on their second subchannel from 2013 until February 1, 2018, when it moved to KNLC-TV (channel 24), which was sold in December 2017 to MeTV parent Weigel Broadcasting. This allowed Meredith to air Cozi TV for the first time in the St. Louis market (it had entered an agreement to air on Meredith stations in early 2016, but KMOV's circumstances with MeTV and MyNetworkTV under their previous Belo ownership prevented Cozi TV from being carried until that point).

Analog-to-digital conversion
KMOV shut down its analog signal, over VHF channel 4, on June 12, 2009, the official date in which full-power television stations in the United States transitioned from analog to digital broadcasts under federal mandate. The station's digital signal relocated from its pre-transition UHF channel 56, which was among the high-band UHF channels (52–69) that were removed from broadcasting use as a result of the transition, to UHF channel 24 (which was previously used for the analog signal of KNLC). Through the use of PSIP, digital television receivers continues to display the station's virtual channel as its former VHF analog channel 4.

References

External links

CBS network affiliates
Cozi TV affiliates
Ion Mystery affiliates
Circle (TV network) affiliates
Television channels and stations established in 1954
Television stations in St. Louis
1954 establishments in Missouri
Gray Television
Peabody Award winners
National Football League primary television stations
National Hockey League over-the-air television broadcasters
Former Viacom subsidiaries
Former CBS Corporation subsidiaries
Former Meredith Corporation subsidiaries